Paula Aiko Nakayama (born October 19, 1953) of Honolulu, Hawaii is an Associate Justice of the Hawaii State Supreme Court. After Rhoda V. Lewis, Nakayama is second woman to ever serve on the Hawaii State Supreme Court. She is also the first Asian American woman to serve as a state supreme court justice nationwide. Currently serving her third term, Nakayama served her first term from 1993 to 2003 and her second term from 2003 to 2013.

Early life and education
Nakayama is the daughter of Harry Nakayama, a WWII veteran of the 442nd Regimental Combat Team, and Harriet Nakayama, who were both born and raised on Maui. At a young age, Nakayama moved to San Jose, California where she graduated from Blackford High School. She then went on to study at the University of California at Davis where she obtained her bachelor's degree in consumer economics. She obtained her doctorate of jurisprudence at the Hastings College of Law.

Career
In 1979, Nakayama joined the staff of the Prosecuting Attorney of Honolulu as a deputy prosecutor. In 1982, she joined the law firm Shim, Tam, Sigal and Naito where she became a partner.

It was from private practice that in 1992, Governor John Waihee appointed Nakayama to the Hawaii State Judiciary as a circuit court judge. Confident of her skill, the governor elevated Nakayama to the Hawaii State Supreme Court in 1993 — the first woman on the court in 26 years. The Hawaii Judicial Selection Commission retained and reappointed Nakayama for a second term in 2003 and for a third term in 2013.

Nakayama's notable written opinions include her 1996 opinion that ruled policyholders can sue insurance companies for acting in "bad faith" for delaying payment of claims, and her 2000 majority opinion rejecting part of the state water commission's landmark decision that divided Waiahole Ditch water between Windward and Leeward Oahu, which reaffirmed the state's commitment to the public trust doctrine "to protect, control and regulate the use of Hawai'i's water resources for the benefit of its people."

Personal life
Nakayama is married to attorney Charles Totto, who formerly served as executive director of the Honolulu Ethics Commission.

See also
List of Asian American jurists

References

1953 births
Living people
People from San Jose, California
University of California, Davis alumni
University of California, Hastings College of the Law alumni
Hawaii state court judges
Justices of the Hawaii Supreme Court
American jurists of Japanese descent
20th-century American judges
21st-century American judges
20th-century American women judges
21st-century American women judges